The Koblandy Batyr Stadium (Qobylandy batyr stadıony) is the main football arena of the city and for FC Aktobe. It was constructed in 1975. On the opening day on August 28, 1975, Aktyubinets (now FC Aktobe) played against CSKA Moscow. Match ended with score 1:0 in favor of visiting team. Kopeykin scored the goal.

The stadium is one of the best attended in Kazakhstan with capacity of just under 13,500 people.

Information
The stadium meets international standards and is considered one of the best in Kazakhstan in terms of technical equipment and originality of construction. It has four tribunes called after the cardinal points. The main tribune – western, which holds seats for commentators and VIP. On the east tribune special seats for disabled people are provided. The stadium has roof over all seats and a big screen. Cash desk and office of FC Aktobe are located in the stadium. There are no running tracks, as it is purely a football stadium.

Main characteristics of stadium
 Field size – 105m x 68 m
 Capacity – 12.805 people
 Surface – natural
 Capacity of guest sector – 500 seats
 Number of TV positions – 3
 Commentator positions – 2 seats
 Press— 20 seats
 Lighting – 1800th lux.
 Video board – display system – 10х9 m
 Number of cash desks – 5
 Surveillance cameras – 6 internal, 4 external

Reconstruction
After the stadium opened in 1975, the last reconstruction was in 2000, when plastic seating and the light-emitting diode board were installed. In 2005 the stadium met all UEFA standards. Heating system, water supply and the sewage were replaced. The press center area was expanded to 54 sq.m., and the dispatcher room to 21 sq.m. 142 bulbs in the floodlight system with a total capacity of 1800 watts were installed. The grass was replaced and an automatic watering system installed. Installation of under soil heating of the pitch started on April 28, 2011 and the lawn was renewed again for the first time after 2005. This system is only used in early Spring and late Autumn (Fall) to assist grass growth.

Facts
For five years, from October 2, 2004 to August 27, 2009 (1790 days, a record of Kazakhstan) FC Aktobe did not suffer a single loss at the home field in all tournaments (Kazakhstan Premier League, Kazakhstan Cup, UEFA Champions League and Europa League). This record was broken only after defeat to Werder Bremen.

Aktobe has not suffered defeat, not even in the years from 2010 to 2011. Only on May 6, 2012 they lost to the guest FC Tobol and then also to Akzhaiyk and Genk from Belgium.

National team games

Address
 56, Abilkhayir khan Avenue, 030000, Aktobe, Kazakhstan

References

Football venues in Kazakhstan
Multi-purpose stadiums in Kazakhstan